The 2005 Minneapolis municipal elections in the U.S. state of Minnesota held a scheduled primary election on 13 September and a general election on 8 November. Voters in the city elected:
 1 mayor
 13 city council members, elected by ward
 6 Minneapolis Public Library trustees
 2 members of the Board of Estimate and Taxation, and
 3 at-large and 6 elected by district members of the Park and Recreation Board.

Later developments
City Council Member Dean Zimmermann was accused by the Federal Bureau of Investigation of accepting bribes, see Minneapolis City Council. In December 2006, he was convicted and sentenced to prison. He was held in a Federal Prison in Colorado, but was released in summer 2008 to a halfway house in Minneapolis.

Primary Results, Mayor
 Incumbent R.T. Rybak and Hennepin County Commissioner Peter McLaughlin, both DFLers, advanced to the general election on November 8 for the mayoral post. Both candidates had sought endorsement at the DFL City Convention, but neither was able to reach the 60% required .  In the Primary election, Rybak was the overall winner with 44.49% of the vote, while McLaughlin received 35.33%. Full election results are available on the City's website .

General Election Results

Mayor
 Incumbent mayor, R.T. Rybak, was reelected.

City Council 
 The DFL-endorsed candidates won in all races except Ward 2 (Green Party Cam Gordon won by 141 votes over DFLer Cara Letofsky). In wards where there was no DFL endorsement (8 & 10), the seat was won by the candidate who came closest to getting the DFL endorsement.

Other Offices
 In other offices, the DFL-endorsed candidates won in all races except 1 Park Board seat (Incumbent Annie Young had no DFL-endorsed opponent) and 1 Library Board seat (Incumbent Anita Duckor (independent) beat Gary Thaden (DFL). (Thaden was later appointed by the Minneapolis City Council).

See also
 2009 Minneapolis municipal elections

External links
 Minneapolis Elections Office
 Minneapolis candidate links and discussion from E-Democracy.Org
 Minneapolis Observer - Community newspaper covering the elections

Minneapolis–Saint Paul
History of Minneapolis
Minneapolis
2005 Minnesota elections